The Parish Church of St Luke The Evangelist Church Parade, Brislington area of Bristol, England.

History

St Luke's Church was built in the 15th century, which is believed to have been founded by Thomas la Warr in around 1420. with the north arcade and aisle being remodelled in 1819, and the east end in 1874 by Benjamin Ferrey.  It includes a bell dating from 1766 and made by Thomas Bilbie of the Bilbie family.

It has been designated by English Heritage as a grade II* listed building.

See also
 Churches in Bristol
 Grade II* listed buildings in Bristol

References

15th-century church buildings in England
Church of England church buildings in Bristol
Diocese of Bristol
Grade II* listed churches in Bristol